Ewoud Gommans (born ) is a Dutch male volleyball player. He is part of the Netherlands men's national volleyball team. On club level he plays for CS Dinamo in Bucharest, Romania.

References

External links
 profile at FIVB.org

1990 births
Living people
Dutch men's volleyball players
People from Voorschoten
Sportspeople from South Holland